Les Misérables is a 2019 French crime thriller film directed by Ladj Ly in his full-length feature directorial debut, from a screenplay by Ly, Giordano Gederlini and Alexis Manenti, based on Ly's 2017 short film of the same name. Manenti stars alongside Damien Bonnard, Djebril Zonga, Issa Percia, Al-Hassan Ly, Steve Tientcheu, Almany Kanoute and Nizar Ben Fatma.

The film, set in the commune of Montfermeil in the aftermath of the 2018 FIFA World Cup, is based on a real-life occurrence of police violence which took place in the city on 14 October 2008, and was observed and filmed by Ly. The story follows several characters within the commune, as a theft from a teenager spirals into the threat of a large crisis. The film's title is a reference to the Victor Hugo 1862 novel of the same name, written in Montfermeil and partially set in it; in the novel, Montfermeil is also the setting of the meeting of Jean Valjean and Cosette, a girl abused by her adoptive parents. The film depicts abuses against poor citizens, especially teenagers of sub-Saharan African or Maghrebi ethnicities, thus stressing the continuity in the fate of the poor in Montfermeil.

It had its world premiere on 15 May 2019 at the Cannes Film Festival, where it won the Jury Prize. It was released in France on 20 November 2019 and received critical acclaim, earning twelve nominations at the César Awards and winning four including Best Film. Among other honors, it was selected as the French entry for the Best International Feature Film at the 92nd Academy Awards, eventually achieving the nomination.

Plot
The film begins with images of the crowd in Paris celebrating the victory of the French team at the 2018 FIFA World Cup in the Avenue des Champs-Élysées, which had been perceived and celebrated in France as a moment of brotherhood between people of different social classes, ethnicities or backgrounds.

Soon after, Stéphane Ruiz, a police officer who recently moved to Paris and joined the anti-crime brigade, is assigned to work with squad leader Chris and brigadier Gwada on duty in the nearby city of Montfermeil. Chris often aggressively abuses his power on young people, with Gwada complacent with that abuse; while he feels unease, Stéphane doesn't interfere. Meanwhile, Issa, a known juvenile delinquent, steals Johnny, a lion cub, from a circus, causing its owner Zorro to go to the local community leader known as "the Mayor" and threaten to return with firearms if Johnny is not returned. Chris and his squadron are tasked with finding and retrieving the cub.

One of Issa's friends takes a picture of Issa with the cub and posts it on Instagram, leading Chris to find out that Issa is the culprit. They chase, capture and handcuff him, but he claims that the cub had run away. Issa's friends then attack the three officers, throwing things at them to stop them from taking Issa in. When Issa tries to run away, Gwada, having accidentally teargassed himself during the chase, shoots him in the face with a flash-ball. Issa's friends scatter, but the squadron realize that they have been filmed by a drone, which escapes. While Stéphane wants to take a badly wounded Issa to a hospital, Chris and Gwada refuse, and instead the trio take him with them in their search for the drone's owner.

The trio arrive at a local neighborhood contact of Chris, leaving Issa in their care and using information given to them by that contact to find Buzz, the person the drone belongs to, forcing him to flee before he can upload the video. Buzz, who still carries the drone's memory card, escapes the squadron and takes shelter with Salah, a restaurant owner and key member of the local Islamic community. Both the squadron and the Mayor, having found out, arrive at Salah's restaurant. After a tense confrontation during which Chris attempts to illegally arrest Buzz, Ruiz convinces Salah to give him the memory card, claiming that Issa's shooting was just an accident.

After recovering Issa and the cub (which happened to be spotted near them), the squadron takes the two to the circus. Although Issa is made to apologize, Zorro attempts to lock him as well as the cub inside a cage with a lion, scaring Issa into wetting himself and almost making Stéphane shoot the lion, until Issa is eventually let go. Deciding that Issa has learned his lesson, Chris drops him off and warns him not to tell anyone what happened, and, if asked about his injury, to say that he slipped and fell. In the evening, the characters involved in that day's event seemingly return to their normal lives, some with visible signs of distress and doubt. Issa, who had been told earlier that his father did not want him back home because of his behavior, sits alone on a ruined couch, traumatized. Later that night, Ruiz meets Gwada in a bar and tells him that he knows that a flash-ball cannot be fired by accident, and that Gwada had therefore intentionally shot Issa. Gwada blames his stress and the group for overwhelming him, and Stéphane, while unconvinced, leaves Gwada with the card, telling him to "do what you gotta do".

The next day, the squadron, while on patrol, gets attacked by a small group led by Issa. They chase them, falling into Issa's trap and ending up assaulted by a much larger group of young people, leaving them trapped from all sides in a stairwell and fighting for their lives. Chris is wounded when a bottle breaks on his face, and the backup car Stéphane radios for gets immediately destroyed by the young people, forcing the backup policemen to flee. They also attack the Mayor's office, and end up clubbing him and throwing him down a set of stairs. Stéphane pounds on the nearest door, begging for help, which happens to be the door to Buzz's apartment; however, Buzz further locks the door. Issa lights a molotov cocktail and prepares to finish the squadron off with it, leading Stéphane to point his gun at him and warn him not to. The screen fades to black as both Issa and Stéphane try to decide what to do next, and a quote from Victor Hugo's Les Misérables appears: "Remember this, my friends: there are no such things as bad plants or bad humans. There are only bad cultivators."

Cast
Damien Bonnard as Brigadier Stéphane Ruiz
Alexis Manenti as Chris
Djebril Zonga as Gwada
Issa Perica as Issa
Al-Hassan Ly as Buzz
Steve Tientcheu as The Mayor
Almamy Kanoute as Salah
Nazar Ben Fatma as La Pince
Raymond Lopez as Zorro
Jeanne Balibar as The Commissioner

Production
In October 2018, it was announced Damien Bonnard, Alexis Manenti and Djebril Zonga had joined the cast of the film, with Ladj Ly directing from a screenplay he wrote alongside Giordano Gederlini and Alexis Manenti.

Release
The film had its world premiere at the Cannes Film Festival on 15 May 2019. Shortly after, Amazon Studios acquired U.S. distribution rights to the film. It also screened at the Toronto International Film Festival on 10 September 2019. It was released in France on 20 November 2019 by Le Pacte. It was released in the United States on 10 January 2020.

Reception

Box office
Les Misérables grossed $330,181 in the United States and Canada and $18,8 million in other territories for a worldwide total of $19.2 million, against a production budget of about $2.5 million.

Critical response
The website's critical consensus reads, "Les Misérables transcends its unwieldy story with compelling ideas and an infectious energy that boils over during a thrilling final act." On Metacritic, the film has a weighted average score of 78 out of 100, based on 35 critics, indicating "generally favorable reviews."

Political reactions
Le Journal du dimanche revealed that Emmanuel Macron was "upset by the accuracy" of Les Misérables, so much so that he "asked the government to hurry to find ideas and act to improve living conditions in the banlieues".

People such as Jean-Louis Borloo support the film, and Valérie Pécresse wrote in a tweet: "Proud that the region supported #LesMiserables a real film about the banlieue, which alerts us to the absolute necessity of a plan for the banlieues which does away with ghetto neighbourhoods, with a real ten year strategy!"

Awards and nominations

See also
 La Haine, a film with a similar theme and setting
 List of submissions to the 92nd Academy Awards for Best International Feature Film
 List of French submissions for the Academy Award for Best International Feature Film

References

External links
 
 
 
 

2019 films
2019 drama films
2019 thriller films
2019 thriller drama films
2010s French-language films
French thriller films
French thriller drama films
Films set in 2018
French crime drama films
Films set in Île-de-France
Films set in Paris
Films shot in Île-de-France
Films shot in Paris
Amazon Studios films
Best Film César Award winners
Films about juvenile delinquency
Films about police officers
Films about police misconduct
Features based on short films
Drone films
2010s French films